Troelstra is a surname of Frisian origin. Notable people with the surname include:

 Pieter Jelles Troelstra (1860–1930), Dutch socialist politician
 Anne Sjerp Troelstra (1939–2019), Dutch mathematician
 Jelle Troelstra (1891–1979), Dutch painter

Dutch-language surnames
Surnames of Frisian origin